Synuchus dubius is a species of ground beetle in the subfamily Harpalinae. It was described by John Lawrence LeConte in 1854.

References

Synuchus
Beetles described in 1854